Cheops Pyramid is a  summit located in the Grand Canyon, in Coconino County of Arizona, US. This butte is situated four miles north of Grand Canyon Village, 2.5 miles south-southwest of Buddha Temple, and 1.7 mile south-southeast of Isis Temple, which is the nearest higher neighbor. It was named by George Wharton James for the fanciful resemblance to the famous pyramid constructed by Egyptian Pharaoh Cheops. This was in keeping with Clarence Dutton's tradition of naming geographical features in the Grand Canyon after mythological deities. This butte's name was officially adopted in 1906 by the U.S. Board on Geographic Names. According to the Köppen climate classification system, Cheops Pyramid is located in a Cold semi-arid climate zone.

Geology

Cheops Pyramid is a flat-topped erosional remnant composed of Mississippian Redwall Limestone, overlaying the green shale slopes of the Cambrian Tonto Group, and below that red shale and Shinumo Quartzite of the Proterozoic Unkar Group. Precipitation runoff from Cheops Pyramid drains south to the Colorado River via Phantom Creek (east), and Ninetyone Mile Creek (west).

See also
 Geology of the Grand Canyon area
 Grand Canyon Supergroup

Gallery

References

External links 

 Weather forecast: National Weather Service

Grand Canyon
Landforms of Coconino County, Arizona
Mountains of Arizona
Mountains of Coconino County, Arizona
Colorado Plateau
Grand Canyon National Park
North American 1000 m summits